Chris Clements (born February 9, 1976) is a retired Canadian professional mixed martial artist who most recently competed in the Ultimate Fighting Championships(UFC) in the Welterweight division. A professional competitor since 2005, Clements has also formerly competed for the IFL.

Background
Born and raised in Ontario, Canada, Clements began training in Tae Kwon Do ate age 16. Later, he picked up boxing and kickboxing before turning his focus to a professional MMA career.

Mixed martial arts career

Early career
Clements made his professional MMA debut in June 2005, and fought primarily in his native Canada. In Clements' third fight, opponent Lautaro Tucas charged across the ring at the opening bell with his hands down and was knocked completely out by a right hand from Clements, who had time to deliver a few punches to Tucas' unconscious body before the referee stopped the fight at 3 seconds of the first round, setting a record for the fastest knockout in MMA history. Clements amassed a record of 10-4 with knockout wins over UFC veterans Rich Clementi and Jonathan Goulet before joining the UFC himself in 2012.

Ultimate Fighting Championship
Clements made his UFC debut against Keith Wisniewski on April 21, 2012 at UFC 145. He won the fight via split decision.

Clements was expected to face Siyar Bahadurzada on July 21, 2012 at UFC 149, replacing an injured Thiago Alves, however, on June 30, Bahadurzada was forced out of the fight. He was replaced by Matthew Riddle. Clements lost the fight via arm-triangle choke in the third round. However, on October 20, 2012, it was revealed that Riddle has tested positive for a banned substance (marijuana) and the result was overturned and changed to a No Contest.

Clements next fought Stephen Thompson on September 21, 2013 at UFC 165. He lost the fight via knockout in the second round.

Clements faced Vik Grujic on November 8, 2014 at UFC Fight Night 55. Clements won the fight via TKO in the first round.

Clements faced Nordine Taleb on April 25, 2015 at UFC 186 after Taleb's original opponent, Cláudio Silva, broke his foot. Clements lost the fight by unanimous decision and was subsequently released from the promotion.

Mixed martial arts record

|-
|Loss
|align=center|12–6 (1)
|Nordine Taleb
|Decision (unanimous)
|UFC 186
|
|align=center|3
|align=center|5:00
|Montreal, Quebec, Canada
|
|-
| Win 
|align=center|12–5 (1)
| Vik Grujic
| TKO (knees and punches)
| UFC Fight Night: Rockhold vs. Bisping
|
|align=center|1
|align=center|3:06
|Sydney, Australia
|
|-
| Loss
|align=center|11–5 (1)
| Stephen Thompson
| KO (punches)
| UFC 165
|
|align=center|2
|align=center|1:27
|Toronto, Ontario, Canada
|
|-
| NC
|align=center|11–4 (1)
| Matthew Riddle
| No Contest (overturned)
| UFC 149
|
|align=center|3
|align=center|2:02
|Calgary, Alberta, Canada
|
|-
| Win
|align=center|11–4
| Keith Wisniewski
| Decision (split)
| UFC 145
|
|align=center|3
|align=center|5:00
|Atlanta, Georgia, United States
|
|-
| Win
|align=center|10–4
| Rich Clementi
| TKO (punches)
| Score Fighting Series 3
|
|align=center|3
|align=center|3:17
|Sarnia, Ontario, Canada
|
|-
| Win
|align=center|9–4
| Travis Briere
| TKO (spinning back kick)
| PFC 1: Border Wars
|
|align=center| 2
|align=center| 0:31
|Windsor, Ontario, Canada
|
|-
| Win
|align=center|8–4
| Jonathan Goulet
| KO (punches)
| Ringside MMA: Payback
|
|align=center| 2
|align=center| 1:06
|Montreal, Quebec, Canada
|
|-
| Win
|align=center|7–4
| Caleb Grummet
| TKO (punches)
| XCC: Battle at the Border 10
|
|align=center| 2
|align=center| 1:42
|Algonac, Michigan, United States
| 
|-
| Loss
|align=center|6–4
| John Alessio
| Submission (guillotine choke)
| W-1 MMA 4: Bad Blood
|
|align=center|1
|align=center|4:24
|Montreal, Quebec, Canada
| 
|-
| Win
|align=center|6–3
| Mark Blackburn
| TKO (punches)
| Ringside MMA 2: Rage Fighting
|
|align=center| 1
|align=center| 1:52
|Montreal, Quebec, Canada
| 
|-
| Loss
|align=center|5–3
| Jesse Bongfeldt
| Submission (rear-naked choke)
| TKO 30: Apocalypse
|
|align=center| 2
|align=center| 1:57
|Montreal, Quebec, Canada
| 
|-
| Loss
|align=center|5–2
| Rory Markham
| TKO (punches)
| IFL: 2007 Semifinals
|
|align=center| 1
|align=center| 1:17
|East Rutherford, New Jersey, United States
| 
|-
| Win
|align=center|5–1
| David Medd
| TKO (punches)
| TKO 28: Inevitable
|
|align=center| 2
|align=center| 1:54
|Montreal, Quebec, Canada
| 
|-
| Win
|align=center|4–1
| Steve Pouliot
| TKO (punches)
| TKO 27: Reincarnation
|
|align=center| 1
|align=center| 3:16
|Montreal, Quebec, Canada
| 
|-
| Win
|align=center|3–1
| Martin Grandmont
| TKO (punches)
| TKO 26: Heatwave
|
|align=center| 1
|align=center| 4:00
|Victoriaville, Quebec, Canada
| 
|-
| Win
|align=center|2–1
| Lautaro Tucas
| KO (punch)
| TKO 25: Confrontation
| 
|align=center| 1
|align=center| 0:03
|Montreal, Quebec, Canada
|
|-
| Loss
|align=center|1–1
| Joey Guel
| Submission (rear-naked choke)
| Extreme Challenge 63
| 
|align=center| 3
|align=center| 0:56
|Hayward, Wisconsin, United States
|
|-
| Win
|align=center|1–0
| Brad Calder
| TKO (punches)
| UCW 2: Caged Inferno
| 
|align=center| 1
|align=center| 1:40
|Winnipeg, Manitoba, Canada
|

See also
 List of male mixed martial artists
 List of Canadian UFC fighters

References

External links
 
 
 

1976 births
Canadian male mixed martial artists
Canadian male taekwondo practitioners
Canadian practitioners of Brazilian jiu-jitsu
Living people
Sportspeople from Chatham-Kent
Welterweight mixed martial artists
Mixed martial artists utilizing taekwondo
Mixed martial artists utilizing boxing
Mixed martial artists utilizing Brazilian jiu-jitsu
Ultimate Fighting Championship male fighters